H. glaber  may refer to:
 Heterocephalus glaber, the naked mole rat, sand puppy or desert mole rat, a burrowing rodent species native to parts of East Africa
 Hylodes glaber, a frog species endemic to Brazil
 Hymenocoleus glaber, a plant species endemic to Cameroon

See also
 Glaber (disambiguation)